Ciamis Sundanese or Ciamis dialect or Southeastern dialect is a term for a variety of conversations Sundanese spoken by people in the southeastern region of the West Java Province especially Ciamis Regency, Banjar City and Pangandaran Regency and in the southwest region of Central Java Province such as Cilacap Regency. This dialect is language variety and is considered to be on one side of linguistic continuum with standard form Sundanese is Priangan Sundanese which is on the other side, thus causing some different variations of lexicon, but in general there is no significant linguistic difference with Priangan Sundanese.

The linguistic diversity in the Ciamis area is influenced by the location of geography which is surrounded by regencies and area which are linguistically different, next to northwest, northeast, southwest geographical situation mountainous, then lowland is swamp  the east (central and south), the state of highway which divides and opens Ciamis to the west to Tasikmalaya, and to the east to Central Java.

Introduction 
Geographically, Ciamis Regency (also includes Banjar City and Pangandaran Regency) surrounded by areas that have characteristics of using different languages. Tasikmalaya Regency in the west is considered a transition Priangan Sundanese. Majalengka Regency and Kuningan district in the north are considered as dialect areas of Sundanese which are different from the Sundanese dialect of Priangan. Central Java Province to the east is another language area. Geographical conditions like this have led to allegations of an influence on the use of the Sundanese language in Ciamis Regency.

Ciamis as a unit geographic is also likely to show the peculiarities of using certain languages so that it is often heard that ordinary people in West Java say there is something called "Sundanese dialect of Ciamis".

This article will explain the description of Ciamis Sundanese related to things such as sounds of language, the use of distinctive elements, linguistic variations that are tied to territory, the influence of foreign languages, and several other language symptoms.

Usages

Language area 

Administratively, Ciamis Regency is directly adjacent to Central Java Province in the east. The area of use of Sundanese is not only in Ciamis Regency, but also in Central Java Province, especially on the eastern border of Ciamis the north where the shape of the area of use protrudes into the area Central Java Province (Dayeuhluhur, Wanareja, Majenang, and Cimanggu).

Scope of use 
Ciamis Sundanese is used in various ways and in various circumstances, for example, in home, in school, in community, in correspondence, and in mass media. Use at home can occur between conversation a child with father, mother, relatives, other family, and domestic workers. Uses in schools include language of instruction, association between students, antarguru, and between teachers and students. Use in the community takes place with neighbors, ethnic group, takes place in mosque or church, in work, and in entertainment. The use in correspondence takes place in correspondence, both official and personal. Uses in mass media, among others, occur through radio, television, cinema, recording, newspaper, magazine, book, and speech.

Language status 
According to the speakers, Ciamis Sundanese is standard language because it is considered to have standardization, autonomy, and history alone, in addition, the speakers consider that the Sundanese language has a status that is not low. As evidenced by the intensive use of the Sundanese language in Ciamis Regency.

Role of language 
In accordance with its position, Ciamis Sundanese acts as a regional language and is considered very important in relation to the function of Indonesian language. In various situations and interests, Ciamis Sundanese is always adapted. According to the observations that have been made, Ciamis Sundanese is considered very important by the speakers, in addition to Indonesian which also has an equally important role in the lives of these speakers.

Literary tradition 
Ciamis Sundanese is used in various forms of literary works, both in the form of oral literature and written literature. Its use can be seen in several folk tales which are expressed using Ciamis Sundanese.

Examples of literary figures or writers who often use Ciamis Sundanese in their works are Ahmad Bakri, who is a writer from the Rancah, Ciamis. Some of his works can be seen at Google Books like the examples, Payung Butut, Rajapati di Pananjung, dan Sudagar Batik.

Phonology 
The phonology found in Ciamis Sundanese does not show any difference with the phonology of Standard Sundanese.

Consonants

Vowels

Types and distribution of phonemes 

The chart below shows the types and phonemes of Ciamis Sundanese.

Notes 
 The consonant burst in the final position is not released.
 Consonant /t͡ʃ/, /d͡ʒ/, nasal /ɲ/, as well as vocals /ə/ not in final position.
 Consonant /k/ in the final position is pronounced clearly, is not removed and is not in the form of a hamzah (glottal).
 Glottal stop sound /ʔ/ occur at the beginning of a word that begins with a vowel, in the middle of a word between two vowels of the same kind, and at the end of a word with an open syllable is not phonemic.

Consonant clusters 
The consonant cluster owned by Ciamis Sundanese is in the form of a letus consonant followed by /r/, /l/, atau /j/, and consonants /s/ followed /r/ or /l/. Below are some examples

Contrast of consonants and vowels 
In the speech area, it is suspected that there are several consonant and vowel contrasts between which:

Distinctive elements 
Based on research conducted by Prawiraatmaja, Suriamiharja, and Hidayat in the book Geografi Dialek Bahasa Sunda di Kabupaten Ciamis , It was found that there were elements that were uniquely used in the Ciamis Regency area, also in the book Kamus Basa Sunda  by R.A. Danadibrata, There are several entries that contain the typical vocabulary used in the Ciamis area, these elements are described below.

Lexical elements

Morphological elements 
Typical elements found at the lexical level include:

 pak- (prefix), a morpheme syntax

Unsur morfosintaksis 
 ka-(A)/sing ka-(A) = sing (A) in Standard Sundanese.

Language variation 
Based on the linguistic area, the distinctiveness of Ciamis Sundanese can also be further divided into several sub-regions, such as area north and area south. The comparison of the peculiarities of the northern and southern regions can be described below.

Variations in coastal areas 
In coastal areas such as Pangandaran, Sundanese has several more variations with regard to pronunciation, word form, and meaning. According to research conducted by Afsari and Muhtadin (2019) in the linguistic journal Pustaka, found a difference phonological, the difference morphological, semantic differences, and onomasiological differences, as described below.

Likewise, the results of Widyastuti's research (2017) in the journal of literary language and culture Lokabasa, Various terms were found in the use of Sundanese in the Sidamulih, Pangandaran area which is different from the standard Sundanese language,  with regard to the term offspring, pronounce, home parts, equipment, food and drink, disease, profession, plants and fruits, hewan, human traits, season and state of nature, as well as the terms of life village and community. Also found a difference phonetic, semantic, onosmasiologist, and semasiology.

Other language symptoms 
The existence of symptoms in Ciamis Sundanese causes sound differences that create variations in the form of synonyms or words that mean the same but sound different. These symptoms are described below.

Phoneme Variation

Vocals 
 ɤ and e : lɤpɤt and lepetʡ 'kind of rice cake'
 a and ɔ : dɔbrah and dɔbroh 'bobol'
 ɛ and ɔ : cɛlɛbɛkan and cɔlɔbɛkan 'plot a small field'
 a and ə : diharəbʡ and dihərəbʡ 'sliced'
 u and ɔ : kusi and kɔsi 'once'
 a and i : kalikibən and kilikibən 'stomach ache after eating'
 a and ɛ : gandonɤn and gɛndonɤn 'goiter'
 i and ɛ : niniʔ and nɛnɛʔ 'grandmother'
 i and ɔ : ʔəniŋ and ʔənɔŋ  'nicknames for girls'
 i and ə : patimuʔ and patemuʔ 'meet'

Consonants 
 h and k : digalɔh and digalɔk 'mixed'
 g and h : gədəbɔgʡ and gədəbɔŋ 'banana tree'
 g and r : gədəbɔgʡ and gədəbɔr 'banana tree'
 ŋ and r : gədəbɔŋ and gədəbɔr 'banana tree'
 b and p : cɛlɛbɛkan and cɛlɛpɛkan 'plot a small field'
 c and s : kacumpɔnan and kasumpɔnan 'fulfilled'
 d and g : danas and ganas 'pineapple'
 l and h : gaɳɔl and gaɳɔh 'kind of sweet potato'
 l and b : gudɛl and gudɛbʡ 'calf'
 p and t : lɛspar and lɛstar 'flat'
 b and g : bəncɔy and gəncɔy 'kind of hood'
 t and d : bɛtan and bɛdan 'bad'
 ŋ and n : taluŋtas and taluntas 'beluntas'
 n and r : risban and risbar 'mangrove'
 w and t : waluntas and taluntas 'beluntas'
 w and b : wakul and bakul 'mixed'

Cluster 
 pontan → pɔntran 'place to bring food'
 cɔlɔbɛkan → clɔbɛkan 'plot a small field'
 cipatiʔ → cipatriʔ 'coconut cream'

Phoneme omission at the beginning 
 naran → ʔaran 'name'
 tɛtɛh → ʔɛtɛh 'a name for an older woman'
 bibi → ʔibi 'aunt'

Phoneme omission in the middle 
 buhayaʔ → buayaʔ 'crocodile'
 muharaʔ → muaraʔ 'estuary'
 titiŋkuhɤn → titiŋkuɤn 'kind of disease'

Phoneme omission at the end 
 saladah → saladaʔ 'lettuce'
 ganɔl → ganɔʔ 'kind of sweet potato'

Penambahan fonem di awal 
 bal → ʔəbal 'ball'
 bel → ʔəbel 'sejenis axe'
 wɔŋ → ʔəwɔŋ 'person'

Addition of a phoneme in the middle 
 mutuʔ → muntuʔ 'quality'
 matakʡ → mantakʡ 'just in case'
 gəbɔgʡ → gədəbɔgʡ 'banana tree'

Adding your element at the beginning 
 mɛntɛŋ → kamɛntɛŋ '(kind of) hamlet'

Adding the element ra at the beginning 
 mɛntɛŋ → ramɛntɛŋ '(kind of) hamlet'

Merger 
 saladah aɛr → saladaɛr 'watercress'

Metathesis 
 lɔgɔjɔ → gɔlɔjɔʔ 'executioner'
 ŋədul → ŋəlud 'lazy'
 laduʔ → daluʔ 'overripe'

Initial syllable repetition (dual) 
 bɛlɛcɛkʡ → bɛbɛlɛcɛkʡ 'small paddy field'
 caŋkir → cacaŋkir 'glass'
 dəmpəl → dədəmpəl 'panganan dari corn'
 gajih → gagajih 'fat'
 jəŋkɔk → jəjəŋkɔk 'small chair'
 kərak → kəkərakʡ 'peek'
 lamukʡ → lalamukʡ 'mega big'
 mutuʔ → mumutuʔ 'quality'

Variation of whole repetition (dual) and initial syllable repetition (dual) 
 ʔɤrihʔ ɤrihɤn → ʔɤɤrihɤn 'kind of disease'
 kamiʔ kamian → kakamian 'each'
 mɛnɛrmɛnɛran → mɛmɛnɛran 'have mercy'

Whole repetition (dual) and vocal changes 
 ʔumah ʔumah 'married'
 sanakʡ sanakʡ 'cousins'
 rawas rawas 'faintly, faintly'
 tabaŋ tabaŋ 'equivocal'
 camatʡ cimutʡ 'eat without lust'
 kulaŋ kalɛŋ 'fishing rod'
 putar patɛr 'unmanaged'
 sipah sipih 'ignorant'
 ʔugaʔ ʔagɛʔ 'hurry up'
 umplaŋampleŋ 'lost'
 uŋkal ɛŋkɔl 'convoluted'
 ʔurayʔaruy 'here and there together'

Add -an element at the end 
 garitʡ-garitan 'farming tools'
 cəprɛtʡ-cəprɛtan 'carpenter's tools'

In addition to synonyms, homonyms or words that are similar but have different meanings are also found.

Information

See also
Sundanese language
Bantenese language
Banyumas Sundanese language
Cirebon Sundanese language
Indramayu Sundanese language

References

Works cited

External links

Ciamis Sundanese 
 The typical Ciamis entry in the Sundanese dictionary entry by R.A. Danadibrata
 Comparison of the Ciamis Sundanese lexicon with Priangan in Wiktionary
 Ki Ganda and Ki Sari Text Transliteration and Translation Edition, Wawacan in Ciamis Sundanese
 Rangga Maléla Ciamis Sundanese story by Olla S. Sumarnaputra.
 Bajigur Kana Hénpon by Wahyu Heriyadi
 Ciamis Mah Gak Ada [Khas Ciamis Pisan], a video YouTube which describes some of the Sundanese language entries of Ciamis

Common Sundanese 

Sundanese language
Ciamis Regency